John Haynes may refer to:

John Haynes (draughtsman) (fl. 1730–1750), British draughtsman and engraver
John Haynes (governor) (1594–1653/54), colonial governor of Massachusetts and Connecticut
John Haynes (journalist) (1850–1917), Australian journalist and politician
John Haynes, Jr. (born 1937), family physician, surgeon and community leader of Northwest Louisiana and Northeast Texas
John Carmichael Haynes (1831–1888), Irish-born rancher, judge and public servant in British Columbia
John Earl Haynes, American historian
John Henry Haynes (1849–1910), American traveller, archaeologist, and photographer
John Randolph Haynes (1853–1937), California socialist
John C. Haynes & Co., American maker of musical instruments (late 19th century)
Johnny Haynes (1934–2005), English footballer

See also
John Haynes Holmes (1879–1964), American politician
John Haines (disambiguation)
John Hanes (disambiguation)